The men's 100 metre freestyle competition of the swimming events at the 1967 Pan American Games took place on 26 July at the Pan Am Pool. The last Pan American Games champion was Steve Clark of US.

This race consisted of two lengths of the pool, both lengths being in freestyle.

Results
All times are in minutes and seconds.

Heats

Final 
The final was held on July 26.

References

Swimming at the 1967 Pan American Games